Sammontana is an Italian Ice cream manufacturer based in Empoli, Italy founded in 1948 when brothers Renzo, Sergio and Loriano Bagnoli decided to start producing ice cream made in their father's bar for sale outside of Empoli. As of 2008, Sammontana has a combined market share of 20% with its "Sammontana" (13%) and "Sanson" (7%) brands.

References 

Italian companies established in 1948
Ice cream brands
Companies based in Tuscany